Onychostoma meridionale is a species of cyprinid in the genus Onychostoma. It inhabits Southeast Asia and is considered "least concern" by the IUCN.

References

meridionale
Cyprinid fish of Asia
IUCN Red List least concern species
Cyprinidae